Bohdan Ivanovych Slyubyk (born 11 February 2004) is a Ukrainian professional footballer who plays as a centre-back for Ukrainian Premier League club Rukh Lviv.

References

External links
 
 

2004 births
Living people
Sportspeople from Lviv Oblast
Ukrainian footballers
Ukraine youth international footballers
Association football defenders
FC Karpaty Lviv players
FC Rukh Lviv players
Ukrainian Premier League players